The following is a list of conflicts in Ghana.

Modern times

Dagbon

 1896 Battle of Adibo

Denkyira
1588–1654 Dutch–Portuguese War
October 25, 1625 Battle of Elmina
August 24, 1637 – August 29, 1637 Battle of Elmina
c. 1675 – c. 1701 Independence of the Ashanti Empire
1701 Battle of Feyiase

Ashanti Empire

c. 1675 – c. 1701 Independence of the Ashanti Empire
1701 Battle of Feyiase
1652–1784 Anglo–Dutch Wars
1780–1784 Fourth Anglo–Dutch War
1781–1782 Shirley's Gold Coast expedition
February 20, 1782 Battle of Elmina
1824–1901 Anglo–Ashanti wars
1806–1816 Earlier wars
1806–1807 Ashanti–Fante War
1811 Ga–Fante War
1814–1816 Ashanti–Akim–Akwapim War
1823–1831 First Anglo-Ashanti War
1823 Battle of Nsamankow
1863 – 1864 Second Anglo-Ashanti War
1873 – 1874 Third Anglo-Ashanti War
January 31, 1874 Battle of Amoaful
February 4, 1874 Battle of Ordashu
December 1895 – February 1896 Fourth Anglo-Ashanti War
March 1900 – September 1900 War of the Golden Stool

Colony of the Gold Coast

1784 Sagbadre War
1824–1901 Anglo–Ashanti wars
1806–1816 Earlier wars
1806–1807 Ashanti–Fante War
1811 Ga–Fante War
1814–1816 Ashanti–Akim–Akwapim War
1823–1831 First Anglo-Ashanti War
1823 Battle of Nsamankow
1837-1839 Dutch–Ahanta War
1863–1864 Second Anglo-Ashanti War
1869-1870 Dutch Gold Coast expedition of 1869–70
1873–1874 Third Anglo-Ashanti War
January 31, 1874 Battle of Amoaful
February 4, 1874 Battle of Ordashu
December 1895 – February 1896 Fourth Anglo-Ashanti War
March 1900 – September 1900 War of the Golden Stool
July 28, 1914 – November 11, 1918 World War I
August 3, 1914 – November 23, 1918 African theatre of World War I
August 9, 1914 – August 26, 1914 Togoland Campaign
August 13, 1914 Battle of Bafilo
August 15, 1914 Battle of Agbeluvhoe
August 22, 1914 Battle of Chra
February 28, 1948 Accra Riots

Republic of Ghana
 1994 – Konkomba–Nanumba conflict
 September 1, 2020 – Present Western Togoland Rebellion

See also
List of wars involving Ghana
Ghana Armed Forces
Ghana Army
Ghana Air Force
Ghana Navy
Military history of Africa
African military systems to 1800
African military systems (1800–1900)
African military systems after 1900

Military history of Ghana
Wars involving Ghana
Conflicts